Sorbus koehneana, Koehne mountain ash, is a species of rowan native to central and southeast China and Qinghai. It is found in mixed forests or thickets in mountains 2,300 to 4,000m above sea level.
It has white fruits and it's famous for the bright red color of its leaves in autumn.

References

koehneana
Trees of China
Endemic flora of China
Plants described in 1906